Khalid El Aamri (born 20 March 1977) is a Moroccan runner. He specializes in cross-country running.

International competitions

Personal bests
1500 metres - 3:38.99 (2006)
3000 metres - 7:34.77 (2006)
5000 metres - 13:06.13 (2006)
10,000 metres - 27:26.24 (2005)

External links

1977 births
Living people
Moroccan male long-distance runners
World Athletics Championships athletes for Morocco
Moroccan male cross country runners
20th-century Moroccan people
21st-century Moroccan people